Liocarinia disjuncta is a species of small sea snail, a marine gastropod mollusk in the family Skeneidae.

Description
(Original description by Ch. Hedley) The height of the shell attains 1.1 mm, its diameter 1.5 mm. This small, pale brown shell has a turbinate shape and is broadly umbilicate. It contains 3 whorls, of which the first 1½ are embryonic. The body whorl is rapidly increasing and descending, at last becoming loose. It is angled at the periphery, at the base and at the umbilical margin. The sculpture of the shell shows above numerous closely packed strong radial ribs, which project as denticules from the periphery. Between the basal and peripheral angles the ribs descend perpendicularly and are crossed by fine spiral threads. Crossing the base the ribs ascend the umbilicus. The simple aperture is oblique and circular.

The minute size, simple aperture and uncoiling of the body whorl distinguish this species.

Distribution
This marine species is endemic to Australia and occurs off New South Wales at depths between 75 m and 91 m.

References

 Laseron, C. 1954. Revision of the Liotiidae of New South Wales. The Australian Zoologist 12(1): 1–25, figs 1–49a
 Iredale, T. & McMichael, D.F. 1962. A reference list of the marine Mollusca of New South Wales. Memoirs of the Australian Museum 11: 1–109

External links
 

disjuncta
Gastropods described in 1903